Heliophanus acutissimus is a jumping spider species in the genus Heliophanus.  It was first described by Wanda Wesołowska in 1986 and is found in Algeria.

References

Spiders described in 1986
Fauna of Algeria
Salticidae
Spiders of Africa
Taxa named by Wanda Wesołowska